"Ascendead Master" is the fourth single by Versailles, but their first single on a major label. Released on June 24, 2009, this is also the band's last single to feature original bassist Jasmine You. Both "Ascendead Master" and "Gekkakou" were "remastered" for their first major album Jubilee.

To accompany this single, Versailles created a fifteen-minute short movie, which is broken up into three acts. Each edition contains a different instrumental track used in the movie and each limited edition's DVD contains one act of the movie, as well as the promotional video for the title track.

Track listing

References 

Versailles (band) songs
2009 singles
Songs written by Hizaki
2009 songs
Warner Music Japan singles
Songs written by Kamijo (musician)